Erkki Lyijynen (16 March 1925 – 24 January 2015) was a Finnish rower. He competed in the men's coxed pair event at the 1952 Summer Olympics.

References

External links
 

1925 births
2015 deaths
Finnish male rowers
Olympic rowers of Finland
Rowers at the 1952 Summer Olympics
People from Lappeenranta
Sportspeople from South Karelia